Who Wants to Get Down? is an acoustic alternative 7" vinyl EP by punk rock singer Joey Cape of Lagwagon and southern rock singer Jon Snodgrass of Drag the River, released on March 2, 2010, through Suburban Home Records.

Each singer contributed one track to the release, with Cape's song being a new previously unreleased song, and Snodgrass' being a b-side song from his solo album. The EP was pressed on various colors of vinyl - 200 red, 300 white and 500 blue.

Track listing

Personnel 
 Joey Cape - lead vocals on "I'm Not Gonna Save You", acoustic guitar, backing vocals
 Jon Snodgrass - lead vocals on "Brave With Strangers", acoustic guitar, backing vocals

References

Joey Cape albums
2009 EPs
Folk punk albums
Suburban Home Records albums